Faieto is a suburb (frazione) of the nearby communal city, Cortino, in the Italian Province of Teramo.  It lies at an altitude of about 2070 feet above sea level.

History
Faieto takes its name from the many stands of beech trees on the village outskirts.  It remains a mystery as to how these trees came to be in this exact location of the Province of Teramo.  In any event, it is likely that in the years just prior to the end of the first century AD, the people  of the Vomano, Tordino and surrounding valleys took refuge here from the raids and incursions of the Saracens and other barbarians.

Written records concerning the history of Faieto are scarce.  According to oral histories, the town at one time was located on the opposite, left bank of the stream known as the Fiumicello, a tributary of the Tordino River.  In present times it is situated on the right bank.  One reason postulated for this change in location relates to a seventeenth century landslide that destroyed all of the houses of the town.  A competing explanation attributes this event to an earthquake sometime around the year 1703 that struck the nearby Gran Sasso region.

At one time Faieto was administered by the commune of Valle San Giovanni.  After the unification of Italy, the citizens of Faieto, along with several neighboring villages, petitioned a modification of their borders.  This request was granted by the Prefect of Teramo on 16 May 1868.  This resulted in the transfer of Faieto, along with the neighboring village of Casanova to the commune of Cortino.

The De Ambrosiis, D'Andrea, Brunozzi families have roots in Faieto dating back many centuries.

Churches
Just above the town is the "Piano delle Macchie" (Plain of Hedges).  Located here was a charitable institution under the tutelage of the Franciscan Fathers from the Sanctuary of Our Mother of Grace in Teramo.  It served as a hospitality point along one of the sheepherder paths leading upwards from Frondarola to Piano Roseto in the nearby mountain ridge known as "Monti della Laga".

In 1640 the new parish church,  Sant Andrea di Faieto, was constructed and further delineated the town of Faieto from that of Casanova.  The church was adorned with items donated by members of the order of the Franciscan Fathers mentioned above.  The date 1519 is inscribed on one portal arch of the church but it is not known if this piece was taken from a previously standing structure.  The originally constructed church had but one side altar but an 1880 expansion added a new presbytery.  The original entrance was at the front of the church.  Where the church door now stands there was likely a simple decorative piece facing the nearby town of Faieto.  At a place of worship on the side altar hangs a painting representing the Sacred Family.  The date and author of this piece are unknown.

In 1930 additional renovations were carried out inside the church and in 1937 frescoes on the ceiling were restored to their original beauty. The main altar as well as the balusters are constructed of granite, obviously a quite arduous and painstaking undertaking.  The heavy building materials had to be transported in pieces on the backs of mules from Valle San Giovanni as no roads capable of being navigated by a carriage existed at that time.  Above the front of the church, in an open bell tower, are found two church bells of differing dimensions.  The smaller of the two was recast in 1890.

Frazioni of the Province of Teramo